Hangarki is a village in Dharwad district of Karnataka, India.

Demographics 
As of the 2011 Census of India there were 445 households in Hangarki and a total population of 2,248 consisting of 1,140 males and 1,108 females. There were 285 children ages 0-6.

References

Villages in Dharwad district